Atrim is a small village in Dorset, England, just north of the large town, Bridport. It is situated on the River Simene. The nearest village is Dottery, closely followed by the larger village of Salway Ash. Atrim is made up of a few houses, and is very near the famous Monarch's Way.

External links 
 

Villages in Dorset